Raichberg is a mountain of Baden-Württemberg, Germany, with an elevation of  above sea level. It is located in Zollernalbkreis close to the northwestern edge of the Schwäbische 'Alb'.

Situated on the summit is Nägelehaus, a guesthouse, as well as a 22 meter high observation tower and the 137 meter high broadcast tower. In clear weather conditions, the observation tower offers an excellent panoramic view of the Black Forest and the Alps.

Mountains and hills of the Swabian Jura
Albstadt